Poplar Hill Airport  is located adjacent to Poplar Hill, Ontario, Canada.

Airlines and destinations

References

External links

Certified airports in Kenora District